George Scott Martin (14 July 1899 – 11 December 1972) was a Scottish football player and manager whose position was inside forward. He played over 200 times for Hull City, won an English Football League winner's medal with Everton in 1928, and served Luton Town as a player and manager.

Playing career
Martin started his career in Scotland with Hamilton Academical before moving south to join Hull City, where he made 218 total appearances and scored 58 goals.

He was signed by Everton in the latter stages of the 1927–28 season and made ten appearances in their ultimately successful title run in to earn his only major honour in the game, the Football League Championship. Martin's time at Goodison Park was mixed however as he spent the majority of his time as a fringe player during the club's relegation in 1930 and promotion again in 1931, before finally making just two appearances in Everton's 1932 title-winning side, which was not sufficient to earn a medal.

Martin left Everton for a short spell at Middlesbrough and then finished his playing career at Luton Town (105 total appearances, 29 goals) before moving into management.

Managerial career
Martin became a coach at Luton Town in August 1939, and was appointed manager on 4 December 1944. After guiding Luton through their first post-war season, he was appointed as Newcastle United's first manager since the end of World War II in May 1947. One of his decisions at the club was surprisingly to sell prolific goalscorer and fans' favourite Len Shackleton to Sunderland for £13,000. This concerned some supporters and Martin was at first criticised for making this move. However the protests were short-lived as Newcastle gained promotion without Shackleton and other popular players were introduced – these included the club's current second highest all-time goal-scorer, Jackie Milburn.

George Martin resigned from Newcastle in 1950 after establishing them as a top six side in the First Division and took over at struggling Aston Villa. Martin was succeeded by Eric Houghton.

He later returned to Luton for a short-lived spell in 1965; he left a year later.

References

Everton FC Player records
George Martin at League Managers Association

1899 births
1972 births
Date of death missing
Scottish footballers
Association football inside forwards
Footballers from South Lanarkshire
Association football coaches
Hamilton Academical F.C. players
Hull City A.F.C. players
Everton F.C. players
Middlesbrough F.C. players
Luton Town F.C. players
Luton Town F.C. non-playing staff
Scottish Junior Football Association players
Scottish Football League players
English Football League players
Scottish football managers
Luton Town F.C. managers
Newcastle United F.C. managers
Aston Villa F.C. managers
English Football League managers
People from Bothwell